Linophryne (from  , 'fishing net' and  , 'toad') is a genus of leftvents, commonly called the "bearded seadevils."

Species
There are currently 22 recognized species in this genus:
 Linophryne algibarbata Waterman, 1939
 Linophryne andersoni Gon, 1992
 Linophryne arborifera Regan, 1925
 Linophryne arcturi Beebe, 1926
 Linophryne argyresca Regan & Trewavas, 1932
 Linophryne bicornis A. E. Parr, 1927
 Linophryne bipennata Bertelsen, 1982
 Linophryne brevibarbata Beebe, 1932
 Linophryne coronata A. E. Parr, 1927
 Linophryne densiramus S. Imai, 1941 (Thickbranch angler)
 Linophryne escaramosa Bertelsen, 1982
 Linophryne indica A. B. Brauer, 1902 (Headlight angler)
 Linophryne lucifer Collett, 1886
 Linophryne macrodon Regan, 1925
 Linophryne maderensis Maul, 1961
 Linophryne parini Bertelsen, 1980
 Linophryne pennibarbata Bertelsen, 1980
 Linophryne polypogon Regan, 1925
 Linophryne quinqueramosus Beebe & Crane, 1947
 Linophryne racemifera Regan & Trewavas, 1932
 Linophryne sexfilis Bertelsen, 1973
 Linophryne trewavasae Bertelsen, 1978

Fossil record
A fossil of what may be L. indica was found in Late Miocene strate of Los Angeles, California, along with a fossil of the related Borophryne apogon, during the construction of a metrorail.

References

Linophrynidae
Marine fish genera
Taxa named by Robert Collett